Henri Nielsen (born 1879, date of death unknown) was a Danish wrestler. He competed in the men's Greco-Roman light heavyweight at the 1908 Summer Olympics.

References

External links
 

1879 births
Year of death missing
Danish male sport wrestlers
Olympic wrestlers of Denmark
Wrestlers at the 1908 Summer Olympics
Place of birth missing